This is the bibliography of Sergei Lukyanenko.

Sergey Lukyanenko ., et al. (1990), Knights of Forty Islands

The story is about several contemporary teenagers "copied" into an artificial environment, where they are forced to play a game with very harsh rules.
The action is set on a set of small sand islands, which are interconnected by narrow bridges, and all the world is under a giant dome, similar to the one from "The Truman show". Inhabitants of each island try to conquer their neighbors.  The mission is difficult primarily due to the fact that forces on each island are roughly equal in ability. Once one group takes over its neighbor island, it bears human losses and becomes vulnerable for an attack from a third side. The goal of the game is to take over all 40 islands, which is practically impossible to achieve. However, if they do so, the winning group will be sent back home. All children die at the age of 18, if they are not killed before. They use only cold weapons. A person who breaks the rules of the game usually accidentally dies or is killed shortly after such violation. The people also believe that they are part of some experiment, run by aliens, but have no idea where they are and what the goals of the experiment are.

The novel, harsh and romantic, mixes various genres, such as "sword and planet", "simulated reality" and "children violence".

Sergey Lukyanenko ., et al. (1990), Nuclear Dream

Island Russia
Trilogy, co-authored with Juliy Burkin.

Two brothers stumble upon a time machine hidden in an artifact dating back to Ancient Egypt. They find themselves in the future, where a Sphinx named Shidla helps them escape and goes with them on an adventure spanning thousands of years of history.

The first novel was adapted into a film called Asiris Nuna. The name comes from the supposed Ancient Egyptian phrase meaning "good night." The phrase is never mentioned in the book.

A Lord from Planet Earth
Trilogy

An action-filled space opera with evolving characters. Each subsequent book involves more ethical problems and philosophy, while at the same time the scale of action steadily increases. This is Lukianenko's only major work that is partially set in the same imaginary universe as the "Road to Wellesberg" series of short stories.

In the novella "A princess is worth dying for", we follow Serge, a young retired sergeant of the Army of the country that now ceased to exist, who accidentally met and loved a Princess. After five years she calls him for help. Serge agrees at once to join her at another planet, Turr. The book is full of fighting with curious weapons (the most effective are plane swords), and galactic laws. Serge is not a weak character, and he knows the price of life — but not his enemies'... The thread going through this book is what love is worth, and what can't be allowed even for the sake of love.

With the main Enemy eliminated, why can't Serge just live with the Princess?

The ancient vanished civilization, the "Seeders" (who seem to have born all known galactic races), left a Temple at each inhabited planet. A Temple is both a keeper of galactic customs, and a beacon for flights in hyperspace – a selection of four beacons defines a destination in 3D space. The Earth is the only planet without a Temple, and no known combination of beacons leading to it. The people of Turr will not accept a Prince from a non-existent planet; and besides that, the Princess doesn't love Serge...

The second book is devoted to efforts of Serge and his friends to find the Earth. It involves well-thought and credible starship battles, etc. Surprisingly, Serge finds a boy from Earth. This, and some other accidents, convince Serge's crew that they have an unknown enemy. A sect called "The Descendants of Seeders" also wants to find "the planet which doesn't exist," to explode a quark bomb on it (a terrible weapon, turning a whole planet to atomic dust), thinking that only this will bring the Seeders back and make the universe wonderful. Who will reach the Earth first? It becomes a race for survival.

The action in the final book approaches the level of total war between two interstellar civilizations with incompatible basic values — and our friends are forced to be between the upper and the nether millstone. Despite harsh action, the style is somehow intrinsically poetic, even metaphoric — Serge will have to deal with a different culture whose values are based on beauty.

Death can seem beautiful, we see charm in destruction... but what lies beneath it all? Aren't pain and fright the real basis of all wars? Aren't all beautiful words justifying wars only the way that we, people, devised to reconcile our consciences with killing?

What is the meaning of life, what is the sense of living? Everybody finds it in his own way, but the large ancient civilization of Fungs found it in beauty. They have a single word for "truth", "beauty", and "faith". They gave up wars long ago. Any Fung that killed another died, realizing the unbeauty of his act. But human culture has taught them otherwise...

A fantasy novel where a modern boy, Danny, comes to a world without sunlight. According to the inhabitants, the sunlight was sold a long time ago to some evil entity. In order to get back home, Danny needs to find some sunlight, or other instance of a matter called "True Light", that could help him open a door back into the real world. All the people are divided into the good Wingers, that live in cities, and the bad Flyings, that live in towers. The Wingers are descendants of the people who sold the sunlight, and the Flyings are a kind of undead who serve a Dark Lord. They are both capable of flying, and continuously fight each other in small local clashes. The plot is a quest, similar to Stephen King's "The Talisman". Danny joins the side of the Wingers, and starts his journey attempting to acquire "True Light".

Line of Delirium
Trilogy

"Sword of Rumatha" Stranger award.

Labyrinth
Trilogy

 "Big Zilant" Zilantcon award.

 "Silver Kladutsey" Star Bridge award.

The Stars Are Cold Toys — Star Shadow

World of Watches
Hexalogy

Night Watch (aka, "The Night Watch Series"")

 "Stranger" award in the nomination "Major form".
 "Silver Kladutsey" Star Bridge award.

Day Watch

Co-authored with Vladimir Vasilyev.
 "Gold Kladutsey" Star Bridge award.
 "Gold Ruscon" Ruscon award.

Twilight Watch

 "Silver Ruscon" Ruscon award.
 "Gold Kladutsey" Star Bridge award.

The Last Watch

The New Watch

The Sixth Watch

Genome
Trilogy

 "Best literature murder of Yuriy Semetskiy" award.

 "Alisa" Ruscon award.

Seekers of the Sky
Duology

 "Russian S.F." Interpresscon award.

 "Silver Kladutsey" Star Bridge award.

 "Gold Ruscon" Ruscon award.
 "Big Urania" Kiyvcon award.
 "Sigma-F" SF Forum award.
 "Bronze snail" Interpresscon award.
 "Gold Kladutsey" Star Bridge award.

Short Story Collections

Beautiful away (Прекрасное далеко)
 My father is an antibiotic (Мой папа - антибиотик)
 Road to Wellesberg (Дорога на Веллесберг)
 The smell of freedom (Запах свободы)
 Almost spring (Почти весна)

H is for Human (Л - значит люди)
 Servant (Слуга)
 H is for Human (Л - значит люди)
 Visit (Визит)
 Train to the Warm Lands (Поезд в Теплый Край)
 The guide to Away (Проводник Отсюда)
 Master of the roads (Хозяин дорог)

The man that couldn't do very much (Человек, который многого не умел)
 Behind the Forest, where the cowardly enemy lurks (За лесом, где подлый враг...)
 The ability to pull the trigger (Способность спустить курок)
 Violation (Нарушение)
 In the name of Earth! (Именем Земли!)
 The man that couldn't do very much  (Человек, который многого не умел)
 Captain (Капитан)
 Last chance (Последний шанс)
 Humans and nonhumans (Люди и не - люди)
 Category "Zed" (Категория "Зет")

Сasual Fuss (Временная суета)
 Сasual Fuss (Временная суета) - Short story, fanfiction.
 Caressing dreams of midnight (Ласковые мечты полуночи)

Poached fugu (Фугу в мундире)
 Duralumin sky (Дюралевое небо)
 Eastern ballad about a valourous cop (Восточная баллада о доблестном менте)
 Poached fugu (Фугу в мундире)

 Transparent Stained-Glass Windows (Прозрачные Витражи)
 Nuclear Dream (Атомный Сон)
 Evening Conference with the Mr Special Deputy (Вечерняя беседа с господином особым послом)
 Footsteps From Behind (Шаги за спиной)
 Ambassadors (Переговорщики)
 Achaula Lalapta (Ахауля Ляляпта)
 Men's Talk (Мужской разговор)
 Professional (Профессионал)
 Coincidence (Совпадение)
 Very Important Cargo (Очень важный груз)
 Age of Moving Pictures (Время движущихся картинок) (essay)
 Case History, or Games that Play People (История болезни, или Игры, которые играют в Людей)
 Night Watch (Ночной Дозор) (preliminary scenario)
 Coblandy-Batur and Barsa-Kelmes (Кобланды-батыр и Барса-Кельмес)
 Argentum Key (Аргентумный ключ)

Building of the Epoch (Стройка века)
 Building of the Epoch (Стройка века)
 Come Off Clear (Сухими из воды)
 Buy a Cat (Купи кота)
 Bloody Orgy in the Martian Hell (Кровавая оргия в марсианском аду)
 If You Contact Us Right Now... (Если вы свяжетесь с нами прямо сейчас...)
 Girl with Chinese Lighters (Девочка с китайскими зажигалками)
 A New, New Fairy Tale (Новая, новая сказка)
 Don't Panic! (Без паники!)

Dive to the Stars (Донырнуть до звезд)
 We Are Not Slaves (Мы не рабы)
 Gadget (Гаджет)
 Dreamweaver (Плетельщица снов)
 I'm Not in Hurry (Не спешу)
 Dive to the Stars (Донырнуть до звезд)
 Evolution of the Scientific Worldview, Based on Fiction Samples (Эволюция научного мировоззрения на примерах из популярной литературы)
 From Columba to Hercules (От Голубя - к Гергулесу)
 Doctor Lem and Nanotechs (Доктор Лем и нанотехи)
 Nothing to Divide (Нечего делить)
 Nanotale (Наносказочка)

Note (Ремарка)
 New Novel "Note" (Ноый роман "Ремарка")
 Drill Away! (Провернуть назад!)
 Steamed Plots (Выпаренные сюжеты)
 If I Wrote "Red Riding Hood" (Если бы я писал "Красную Шапочку")

Recurring Funeral (Периодическая тризна)
 We Aren't Locals Here Ourselves... (Сами мы не местные...)
 Going to the Movies (Хождение в Кино)
 Recurring Funeral (Периодическая тризна)
 Apostles of the Tool (Апостолы инструмента)
 Cripples (Калеки)

Unpublished and early works
 Adventures of Stor (Пpиключения Стоpа) - 1989, Alma-ata, published only on the Internet.
 The 13th City (Тринадцатый гоpод) - 1989, Alma-ata, early work.
 Pier of the golden ships (Пpистань Желтых Коpаблей) - 1990, Alma-ata, early work.
 The Eighth Colour of the Rainbow(Восьмой цвет pадуги) - 1992, Alma-ata, early work.
 Competitors (Конкуренты) - 2008, Moscow

Incomplete Works
 Credo (Кредо) - 2003, Moscow, still incomplete.
 Trix (Трикс) - 2005–2008, Moscow, author is working now.

External links
bibliography with annotation from the author's official web page (as of 2000)
electronically available texts in English from the author's official web page

Bibliographies by writer
Bibliographies of Russian writers
Science fiction bibliographies
Fantasy bibliographies